Vidhu Vinod Chopra (born 5 September 1952) is an Indian film director, producer, editor, screenwriter, lyricist and actor. His well-known films as director are Parinda (1988), 1942: A Love Story (1994). He is also known for producing Munna Bhai film series, 3 Idiots (2009), PK (2014), Sanju (2018) under his banner Vinod Chopra Films.

Early life 
Chopra was born and grew up in Srinagar, Jammu and Kashmir, India. His father was D. N. Chopra and veteran filmmaker Ramanand Sagar was his half-brother. His father's family originally came from Peshawar, British India. His paternal uncles were filmmakers Yash Chopra and B. R. Chopra. His paternal first cousins are Aditya Chopra, Karan Johar, and Uday Chopra. His mother was Shanti Devi Mahalakshmi, who left Kashmir with him and her family after the exodus and mass killings of Kashmiri Pandits, due to the Kashmir conflict in 1990. He dedicated his Shikara to his mother, which was based on the same. He has Punjabi Hindu ancestry from his father's side, and Kashmiri Hindu ancestry from his mother's side. He studied film direction at the Film and Television Institute of India in Pune.

Career 
Chopra's first student short film, Murder at Monkey Hill, won the National Film Award for Best Short Experimental Film and the Guru Dutt Memorial Award for Best Student Film.

This was followed by a short documentary highlighting the plight of India's destitute children, called An Encounter with Faces, which was nominated for an Academy Award in the Documentary Short Subject category in 1979. It also won the Grand Prix at the Tampere Film Festival in 1980.

Sazaye Maut, his first full-length feature film, was an adaptation of his previous short, Murder at Monkey Hill. It starred Naseeruddin Shah, Radha Saluja and Dilip Dhawan. Vanraj Bhatia composed the music for the film. For Khamosh, his next directorial venture, Chopra assembled a cast featuring some of the finest acting talent in India. Shabana Azmi, Amol Palekar, Naseeruddin Shah and Pankaj Kapoor, among others, appeared in prominent roles. An inventive meta thriller set in Kashmir, Khamosh remains one of the notable Indian films in the genre.

Parinda (1989), is a landmark film in Hindi cinema. It expanded the orbit of the crime drama and the vocabulary of images used in Hindi films while garnering widespread critical acclaim and numerous awards. Several modern Indian filmmakers have expressed their admiration for and drawn inspiration from Chopra's film.

Chopra's next film, 1942: A Love Story, was a patriotic romantic drama set during the decline of the British Raj. With Anil Kapoor and Manisha Koirala in leading roles, it was also the last film to have its music composed by the legendary R. D. Burman. Burman received a Filmfare Award for Best Music Director and the film won a total of nine awards at the 40th Filmfare Awards.

He founded his own production company, Vinod Chopra Films, in 1985. Since then, the company has gone on to produce major Bollywood films, and is currently one of the biggest and most successful film production houses in India. Bengali filmmaker Ritwik Ghatak affectionately gave him the name 'Vidhu'.

Films 
His critically acclaimed films include Parinda, 1942: A Love Story, Mission Kashmir, the Munna Bhai series, Parineeta, and 3 Idiots. 3 Idiots went on to become one of the most successful films in India, and became the first film in the country to cross Rs. 200 crore at the boxoffice. It also found popular appeal in markets like Taiwan and Korea. His other films,PK and Sanju were one of the highest grossing Indian films. He also made his Hollywood directorial debut with the film Broken Horses in 2015. However, it received a Rotten Tomatoes rating of 22%, and was a commercial disaster, only making Rs. 60 lakh in its opening weekend.

His latest film, Shikara is a Hindi language historical romance film released on 7 February 2020 marking his return to direction in India after 13 years. His last directorial feature film, Eklavya: The Royal Guard released in 2007.

Filmography

Bibliography

Awards and nominations 

Vidhu Vinod Chopra has received one nomination at the Academy Awards, six National Film Awards, and five awards from fourteen nominations at the Filmfare Awards.

IIFA Awards 

 2007: Winner, IIFA Best Screenplay Award for Lage Raho Munna Bhai
 2001: Nominated, IIFA Best Director Award for Mission Kashmir
 2010: Winner, IIFA Best Screenplay Award for 3 Idiots

Stardust Awards 

 2009: Winner, Readers' Choice Award for 3 Idiots

FICCI Awards 

 2009: Winner, Most Successful Film of the Year for 3 Idiots

Zee Cine Awards 

 2007: Winner, Best Screenplay Award for Lage Raho Munna Bhai
 2005: Winner, Best Dialogue Award for Parineeta
 2005: Winner, Best Director Award for Mission Kashmir

Tampere International Short Film Festival 

 1980: Winner, Grand Prix for An Encounter with Faces

Star Screen Awards 

 2006: Winner, Best Film for Lage Raho Munnabhai
 2006: Nominated, Best Screenplay for Lage Raho Munna Bhai
 2009: Winner, Star Screen Award for Best Film, 3 Idiots
 2009: Winner, Star Screen Award for Best Screenplay, 3 Idiots

Personal life 
He has been married thrice, his first wife was actress Renu Saluja (m. 1976–1983), he was then married to filmmaker Shabnam Sukhdev (m. 1985–1989), the daughter of S. Sukhdev (1933–1979) a well known director of documentaries for the Films Division of India. He has a daughter with Shabnam, Ishaa Chopra, who works as a dance instructor and choreographer.

He is currently married to Indian film critic Anupama Chopra, whom he married on 1 June 1990. He has two children with her, a son, Agni and a daughter, Zuni Chopra.

References

External links 

 
 Official Website
 Interview at Rediff

Living people
1952 births
Film directors from Jammu and Kashmir
Hindi-language film directors
People from Srinagar
Telstra People's Choice Award winners
Film and Television Institute of India alumni
Film producers from Jammu and Kashmir
Indian documentary filmmakers
Indian male screenwriters
Filmfare Awards winners
Punjabi people
Hindi film editors
Film editors from Jammu and Kashmir
Best Original Screenplay National Film Award winners
Producers who won the Best Popular Film Providing Wholesome Entertainment National Film Award
Producers who won the Best Debut Feature Film of a Director National Film Award